The Bangladesh Handloom Board is a government owned and operated statutory public sector organisation in Dhaka, Bangladesh. As of 2021, Mohd Rezaul Karim is the chairman of the board.

History
The Bangladesh Handloom Board was established in January 1978 by the government of Bangladesh. It is managed by the Ministry of Textiles and Jute. It oversees the work of 1.5 million individual handloom workers in Bangladesh. It works for the preservation of classical Bangladesh weaving techniques of Benaras Palli, jamdani, and muslin.

In 1981 it established a professional training institute for the use of handloom, in Narsingdi. In 2013, the Bangladesh Handloom Board Act was passed which made minor amendments to how often the board should meet.

References

1978 establishments in Bangladesh
Organisations based in Dhaka
Government agencies of Bangladesh
Textile industry of Bangladesh